The Przemyśl New Synagogue, also known as the Scheinbach Synagogue,  was an Orthodox synagogue in Przemyśl, Poland. Since World War II, the synagogue, which is still standing, has been used as the Ignacy Krasicki Przemyśl Public Library.

History and architecture

Construction on the  began in 1910 and was completed in 1918 after delays caused by the First World War.  The spacious, high-ceilinged building survives, although Communist-period renovations stripped so much of the exterior detail that it presents an appearance in marked contrast to the building shown in old photographs.

The synagogue is a free-standing building in a blend of Rundbogenstil and Classical styles with eclectic decoration.  It was designed by architect Stanisław Majerski.  The elaborate interior decoration once featured Biblical scenes and scenes of Eretz Israel painted on the walls and ceiling.  In its incarnation as a public library, the building has a sedate and functional interior with bookshelves and walls painted white.  The synagogue also had a notable set of stained glass windows. The windows and paintings were by a Jewish Przemyśl artist named Adolf Bienenstock, a graduate of the Jan Matejko Academy of Fine Arts. Kraków, like Przemyśl, was then part of Austrian Galicia (also known as Austrian Poland).  Bienenstock, who taught art at the Przemyśl Gymnasium, had studied under the notable Polish artist Józef Mehoffer.  The interior reflects the influence of the Young Poland movement of which Mehoffer was part. Young Poland was the Polish version of the jugendstil  (art nouveau) movement.

The synagogue was used as a stable by the German army during World War II, then used as a textile factory under the Communist post-War government before being turned into a library in the 1960s.

Image
 http://przemysl.blogspot.com/2008/12/architecture-of-tempel-and-new.html
 https://web.archive.org/web/20081203005600/http://www.shtetlinks.jewishgen.org/Przemysl/photos/show_sygag.shtml

See also
 Zasanie Synagogue
 Old Synagogue (Przemyśl)
 Tempel Synagogue (Przemyśl)

References

Synagogues in Przemyśl
Former synagogues in Poland
Art Nouveau synagogues
Art Nouveau architecture in Poland
Synagogues completed in 1918
Holocaust locations in Poland
Rundbogenstil synagogues
Neoclassical synagogues
Orthodox synagogues in Poland
20th-century religious buildings and structures in Poland